Gregory Thomas Brown (born May 4, 1980) is an American professional baseball coach who is currently an assistant to the GM/minor league hitting coordinator for the Chicago Cubs of Major League Baseball (MLB). He previously served as hitting coach for the Cubs in 2022.

Brown graduated from Lynn University. He played professional baseball in the Florida Marlins organization from 2003 to 2006. He then joined the Houston Astros as a scout. He was the head coach for Nova Southeastern University from 2011 to 2019, before joining the Tampa Bay Rays as their minor league hitting coordinator. The Chicago Cubs hired Brown as their major league hitting coach after the 2021 season.

References

External links

1980 births
Living people
Carolina Mudcats players
Gulf Coast Marlins players
Greensboro Grasshoppers players
Jamestown Jammers players
Jupiter Hammerheads players
Lynn Fighting Knights baseball players